Remote Sensing is a semimonthly peer-reviewed open access academic journal focusing on research pertaining to remote sensing and other disciplines of geography. It was established in 2009 and is published by MDPI. The founding editor-in-chief was Wolfgang Wagner (Vienna University of Technology) until September 2, 2011, when he resigned over the journal's publication of a paper co-authored by Roy Spencer, which had received significant criticism from other scientists soon after its publication. Since then, the editor-in-chief has been Prasad S. Thenkabail (United States Geological Survey).

Abstracting and indexing 
The journal is abstracted and indexed by:

According to the Journal Citation Reports 2019, the journal has a 2016 impact factor of 4.118, ranking it 7th out of 29 journals in the category "Remote Sensing".

See also
 Journal of Applied Remote Sensing
 ISPRS Journal of Photogrammetry and Remote Sensing
 ISPRS International Journal of Geo-Information

References

External links 
 

MDPI academic journals
Remote sensing journals
Geography journals
Monthly journals
Publications established in 2009
Open access journals